"Back When / Going All The Way" is the fourth released by allSTARS* from their only self-titled album AllSTARS*. The single was released on 29 April 2002, one month before their debut album release and two months before they disbanded. The single peaked at #19 in the UK Singles Charts. The song "Going All The Way" appeared in the movie Thunderpants.

Track listing
 Promotional Single
 "Back When" [Xenomania Mix] - 7:12

 UK CD Single
 "Back When" - 3:27
 "Going All The Way" - 3:47
 "Back When" [Xenomania Mix] - 7:12
 "Back When" [Video] - 3:29

 UK Cassette Single
 "Back When" - 3:27
 "Going All The Way" - 3:47
 "Funkey" - 3:13

Vinyl
 "Back When" (Xenomania Mix) - 7:12
 "Back When" (Radio Edit) - 3:27

Chart performance

References

Allstars (band) songs
2002 singles